The Ottawa River is a major waterway in Ontario and Quebec, Canada.

Ottawa River may also refer to:
 Ottawa River (Auglaize River tributary), in Ohio, United States
 Ottawa River (Lake Erie), in Michigan and Ohio in the United States, which drains into Lake Erie
 Ottaway River, an archaic name of the Boardman River in the northwest of Michigan's Lower Peninsula